Michael Lee Graves (born January 8, 1991) is an American mixed martial artist who most recently competed in the Welterweight division of Titan FC, where he is the former Welterweight Champion. A professional competitor since 2013, he formerly competed for the UFC and was also a contestant on The Ultimate Fighter: American Top Team vs. Blackzilians.

Background
Born and raised in Maumee, Ohio, he graduated from Maumee High School (Ohio) where he competed in wrestling. Graves began training in mixed martial arts in 2009 and began competing as an amateur in 2010.

Mixed martial arts career
Graves made his professional mixed martial arts debut in February 2013. He compiled a record of 4–0, competing for various regional promotions in Florida where he finished all of his opponents before trying out for The Ultimate Fighter in late 2014.

The Ultimate Fighter
In February 2015, it was announced that Graves was one of the fighters selected to be on The Ultimate Fighter: American Top Team vs. Blackzilians.

In his first fight on the show, Graves faced Kamaru Usman. He lost the closely contested bout via majority decision.

In his second fight on the show, Graves faced off against Jason Jackson. After nearly being finished in the fight's opening moments (when he was dropped by a groin strike and subsequent follow up punches), he won the fight via submission in the first round.

Ultimate Fighting Championship
Graves made his official debut for the promotion on July 12, 2015, at The Ultimate Fighter 21 Finale where he faced fellow castmate Vicente Luque. He won the fight via unanimous decision.

Graves was expected to face Danny Roberts on December 10, 2015, at UFC Fight Night 80. However, Graves was forced out of the bout with an injury and replaced by Nathan Coy.

Graves next faced Randy Brown on April 16, 2016, at UFC on Fox 19. He won the fight via submission in the second round.

Graves next faced Bojan Veličković on July 30, 2016, at UFC 201. The bout was declared a majority draw (30-27, 28-28, 28-28).

Graves was expected to face Sérgio Moraes on November 19, 2016, at UFC Fight Night 100. However, Graves was removed from the fight on October 3 after he was arrested on a misdemeanor battery charge and was replaced by Zak Ottow. In turn, he was released from the promotion in April 2017.

Post-UFC career
After the release from UFC, Graves signed with Fight Nights Global, where he suffered his first professional career loss against Nikolay Aleksakhin in his promotional debut at Fight Nights Global 74. After the bout Graves fought to a draw with Murat Khasanov at Fight Nights Global 87.

Titan FC
After the brief stint in the Russian promotion, Graves signed with Titan FC again where he faced Gegg Ellis at Titan FC 51 on December 28, 2018. He won the fight via unanimous decision.

Next he faced Jared Gooden for the interim Titan Welterweight Championship at Titan FC 52 on March 15, 2019. Graves won the fight via unanimous decision, becoming the Titan FC interim Welterweight Champion as was subsequently promoted to undisputed Welterweight Champion as Uros Jurisic was stripped of the title.

Graves was expected to make his first title defense against Kamal Magomedov at Titan FC 57, but withdrew from the bout due to an injury. Magomedov fought Italo Goncalves for the interim Welterweight Championship instead and won the title via submission. Graves was scheduled to face Magomedov in a title unification bout at Titan FC 59 on February 28, 2020, but Magomed withdrew from the bout. Graves then headlined Titan FC 59 against Yuri Villefort. Graves successfully defended his title by knocking out Villefort in the fourth round.

Graves faced Oton Jasse at Titan FC 65 on November 22, 2020. At weigh-ins, Graves missed weight by 2 pounds and was therefore stripped of the title. He won the bout via guillotine choke in the first round.

In October 2021, news about Graves tweeting threats to mixed martial arts reporter Amy Kaplan and UFC president Dana White emerged. Simultaneously, Titan FC COO Lex McMahon revealed that Graves had not been under contract with the organization for a while.

Championships and accomplishments
Titan Fighting Championship
Titan FC Interim Welterweight Championship (One time; former)
Titan FC Welterweight Championship (One time; former)
One successful title defense

Mixed martial arts record

|-
|Win
|align=center|10–1–2
|Oton Jasse
|Submission (guillotine choke)
|Titan FC 65: Graves vs. Jasse
|
|align=center|1
|align=center|1:17
|Santo Domingo, Dominican Republic
|
|-
|Win
|align=center|9–1–2
|Yuri Villefort
|TKO (punches)
|Titan FC 59: Graves vs. Villefort
|
|align=center|4
|align=center|4:40
|Fort Lauderdale, Florida, United States
|
|-
|Win
|align=center|8–1–2
|Jared Gooden
|Decision (unanimous)
|Titan FC 53: Bad Blood
|
|align=center|5
|align=center|5:00
|Fort Lauderdale, Florida, United States
|
|-
|Win
|align=center|7–1–2
|Gregg Ellis
|Decision (unanimous)
|Titan FC 51: The Battle of Kazakhstan
|
|align=center|3
|align=center|5:00
|Almaty, Kazakhstan
|
|-
|Draw
|align=center|6–1–2
|Murat Khasanov
|Draw (majority)
|Fight Nights Global 87: Khachatryan vs. Queally
|
|align=center|3
|align=center|5:00
|Rostov-on-Don, Russia
|
|-
|Loss
|align=center|6–1–1
|Nikolay Aleksakhin
|TKO (punches)
|Fight Nights Global 74: Aleksakhin vs. Graves
|
|align=center|3
|align=center|3:06
|Moscow, Russia
|
|-
|Draw
|align=center|6–0–1
|Bojan Veličković
|Draw (majority)
|UFC 201
|
|align=center|3
|align=center|5:00
|Atlanta, Georgia, United States
|
|-
| Win
| align=center| 6–0
| Randy Brown
| Submission (rear-naked choke)
| UFC on Fox: Teixeira vs. Evans
| 
| align=center| 2
| align=center| 2:31
| Tampa, Florida, United States
| 
|-
| Win
| align=center| 5–0
| Vicente Luque
| Decision (unanimous)
| The Ultimate Fighter: American Top Team vs. Blackzilians Finale
| 
| align=center| 3
| align=center| 5:00
| Las Vegas, Nevada, United States
| 
|-
| Win
|align=center| 4–0
|Rafael Souza
| Submission (rear-naked choke)
|Titan FC 31
|
|align=center|2
|align=center|2:37
|Tampa, Florida, United States
|
|-
| Win
|align=center| 3–0
|Rico Farrington
| TKO (punches)
|MTC - In the Beginning
|
|align=center|1
|align=center|2:46
|Fort Lauderdale, Florida, United States
|
|-
|Win
|align=center| 2–0
|Danny Finz
|TKO (punches)
|Fight Time 15
|
|align=center|1
|align=center|1:26
|Fort Lauderdale, Florida, United States
|
|-
|Win
|align=center| 1–0
|Nicolas Ryske
|KO (punches)
|Fight Time 13
|
|align=center|1
|align=center|1:48
|Fort Lauderdale, Florida, United States
|
|-

Mixed martial arts exhibition record

|-
|Win
|align=center| 1–1
|Jason Jackson
|Submission (rear-naked choke)
| The Ultimate Fighter: American Top Team vs. Blackzilians
| (airdate)
|align=center|1
|align=center|3:01
|Coconut Creek, Florida, United States
|
|-
|Loss 
|align=center|0–1
| Kamaru Usman
| Decision (majority) 
| The Ultimate Fighter: American Top Team vs. Blackzilians
| (airdate)
|align=center|2
|align=center|5:00
|Boca Raton, Florida, United States
|
|-

See also
 List of current UFC fighters
 List of male mixed martial artists

References

External links
 
 

1991 births
American male mixed martial artists
Welterweight mixed martial artists
Mixed martial artists utilizing wrestling
Living people
Sportspeople from Toledo, Ohio
People from Coconut Creek, Florida
People from Maumee, Ohio
Mixed martial artists from Ohio
Ultimate Fighting Championship male fighters